Wilson Parker (born 1909) was an English professional footballer who played as a goalkeeper.

Career
Born in Ryton, Parker played for Carlisle United and Bradford City. For Bradford City, he made 125 appearances in the Football League; he also made 11 FA Cup appearances.

Sources

References

1909 births
Year of death missing
English footballers
Carlisle United F.C. players
Bradford City A.F.C. players
English Football League players
Association football goalkeepers